Miss Grand Paraguay 2022 is the fifth edition of the Miss Grand Paraguay beauty contest, held at  in Asunción on 7 May 2022, and was beamed live to a virtual audience worldwide via the pageant YouTube channel named MGM Producciones as well as the national digital television network Unicanal.

Seventeen candidates competed for the national title, of which, Agatha Leon of Ciudad del Este was announced the winner and crowned by Jimena Sosa, Miss Grand Paraguay 2021. Leon will later represent the country at Miss Grand International 2022; programmed to be held in Indonesia on 25 October.

Background

Location and date

Contestant selection
The national aspirants for Miss Grand Paraguay 2022 were either selected directly by the online application through the national organizer or chosen by the regional licensees. On 6 December, 2021, the organization launched its search for the next Paraguayan who will represent the country at the Miss Grand International 2022 competition. The final submission of the application was initially set for February 15, 2022. Of the regional licensee category, four of which held the regional event to determine their representative for the national contest, including the licensees of Ciudad del Este, Paraguarí, Presidente Franco, and San Pedro. However, the Presidente Franco licensee later renounced the license, then the representative of such was instead appointed by the central organ. All of 17 national finalists representing 8 departments and 9 cities were officially revealed on 22 April 2022.

Results summary

Contestants
18 delegates competed for the national title of Miss Grand Paraguay 2022.

References

External links

 

Miss Grand Paraguay
Beauty pageants in Paraguay
Paraguayan awards
Grand Paraguay